Dudiyan is a Turkmen village in northern Aleppo Governorate, northwestern Syria. Nearby localities include Baraghida  to the west and Tat Hims  to the east. In the 2004 census, Dudiyan had a population of 1,164. Traveler Martin Hartmann noted the village as a Turkmen village in late 19th century.

References

Populated places in Azaz District
Turkmen communities in Syria